William Edward Joyce (born December 11, 1959) is an American writer, illustrator, and filmmaker. He has achieved worldwide recognition as an author, artist and pioneer in the digital and animation industry.

He has written and illustrated over 50 bestselling children’s books and novels which have been translated into over 40 languages.

He began his film career on Toy Story and has since been a producer/director/screenwriter/production designer in both animation and live action.

Among his many awards, Bill has won 6 Emmys, 3 Annies and an Academy award for his short film The Fantastic Flying Books of Mr. Morris Lessmore (2011).

Bill was named by Newsweek magazine as “one of the 100 people to watch in the new millennium. His feature films, all based on his books, include Epic, Rise of the Guardians, Robots and Meet the Robinsons. His television series include the groundbreaking computer animated Rolie Polie Olie for which he was creator and showrunner.

He has also painted numerous covers for the New Yorker Magazine.

His new company, Howdybot Studios, is focused on Bill’s stories in a variety of mediums and media. Mr. Joyce’s newest short film Mr. Spam Gets a New Hat (2022) has won awards at a number of film festivals in the U.S. and abroad. He is also in pre-production on an animated version of The Great Gatsby from Apple TV+ and Apple Studios. Both projects are in collaboration with DNEG Studios and Epic Games.

His novel Ollie's Odyssey was adapted into a live action/CG limited series on Netflix in August 2022.

Career

Children's literature
He has written and illustrated over 50 children's books including George Shrinks, Santa Calls, Dinosaur Bob and His Adventures with the Family Lazardo, Rolie Polie Olie, The Leaf Men and the Brave Good Bugs and A Day with Wilbur Robinson, The Fantastic Flying Books of Mr. Morris Lessmore, The Guardians of Childhood series and many others.

His first book “Tammy and the Gigantic Fish” by James and Katherine Gray was published by Harper & Row (now Harper Collins) in 1983. After the retirement of his longtime editor there Laura Gerringer, in 2011 Joyce moved his backlist and all subsequent books to Simon & Schuster where his editor is Caitlyn Dlouhy.

Since being at Simon & Schuster Mr. Joyce has produced a number of bestselling titles, including The Fantastic Flying Books of Mr. Morris Lessmore which debuted at Number 1 on the New York Times bestseller list in July 2012, a position it held for several weeks. Morris Lessmore has been translated into over 40 languages and was named by Time Magazine as one of the 100 best children's books of all time. Morris Lessmore is the most expansive and experimental of Joyce’s stories. With his company Moonbot Studios, Joyce along with his partners, produced the Lessmore story in a variety of media and mediums simultaneously. A short film was in production (using handmade miniature sets) while the book was being illustrated (along with Joe Bluhm) and an interactive story app was being devised.

The story app of Morris Lessmore received overwhelmingly positive attention and in August 2011 briefly dislonged Angry Birds as the bestselling app in the world. It was voted into the app hall of fame soon after.

Film and television
Joyce has received three Emmys for Rolie Polie Olie, a Canadian animated television series based on his series of children's books that aired on Disney Channel (part of Playhouse Disney block) and is currently on Disney+. His second television series, George Shrinks, used to air daily on PBS stations. He has received three additional Emmys for other animated projects.

Joyce created conceptual characters for Disney/Pixar's feature films Toy Story (1995) and A Bug's Life (1998). In 2001 Pixar founder John Lasseter introduced Joyce to animation director Chris Wedge. At this time Wedge’s fledging animation studio Blue Sky was completing its Oscar winning short film Bunny and hoped to begin developing feature animated films, which they soon did with the Ice Age franchise.

In 2002, after Joyce and Ice Age director Chris Wedge attempted to adapt one of Joyce's book Santa Calls into a feature film Santa Calls, during that process they both came up with the idea for the computer-animated feature film Robots (2005). Besides being one of the creators, Joyce also served as a producer and production designer.

In 2005, Joyce and Reel FX launched a joint venture, Aimesworth Amusements, to produce feature films, video games and books. The new company announced plans to make three feature films: The Guardians of Childhood, The Mischevians, and Dinosaur Bob and His Adventures with the Family Lazardo. The first of those projects, The Guardians of Childhood was developed by DreamWorks Animation into the feature film, Rise of the Guardians. It was released in 2012 and is based on Joyce's book series and the short film Man in the Moon, directed by Joyce. Joyce was originally slated to direct the film, however early in the production his daughter Mary Katherine, his wife Elizabeth and his sister Cecile were diagnosed with terminal illnesses. He continued on as an executive producer along with his friend Guillermo del Toro. At the beginning of the end credits Dreamworks dedicated the film to Joyce’s daughter who died before the film's release.

In 2007, Disney released Meet the Robinsons, a feature film based on his book A Day with Wilbur Robinson, to which Joyce served as one of the executive producers of the film along with John Lasseter and Clark Spencer. Joyce had written several drafts of the screenplay and did production design on a number of key characters and sets for the final film.

In August 2009, Joyce and Reel FX co-founder Brandon Oldenburg and producers Lampton Enoch and Alyssa Kantrow founded a Shreveport-based animation and visual effects studio MOONBOT Studios. The studio produced an Oscar-winning animated short film and an iPad app The Fantastic Flying Books of Mr. Morris Lessmore. The short film went on to win an Academy award. A book adaption was released in summer 2012. The studio released in January 2012 another app, The Numberlys. A short film and a bestselling book followed soon after. The Numberlys film was short listed for the 2012 Academy Awards animated short film Oscar.

His book The Leaf Men was adapted by Blue Sky Studios into a 2013 feature film titled Epic, with Joyce as writer, executive producer, and production designer.

In 2021, Joyce wrote and directed the short film Mr. Spam Gets a New Hat with the visual effects company DNEG. DNEG also announced they would be producing a feature animated film adaptation of The Great Gatsby directed by Joyce and written by noted author Brian Selznick (The Invention of Hugo Cabret).

Joyce’s acclaimed young adult novel “Ollie’s Odyssey” has been adopted as a live action/CG hybrid show by Netflix and premieres August 24, 2022. It is the second of Joyces works to be adapted by Peter Ramsey (Rise of the Guardians, Spiderman: Into the Spiderverse 2018).

Awards and accolades

Joyce received the 2008 Louisiana Writer Award for his enduring contribution to the "literary intellectual heritage of Louisiana." The award was presented to him on October 4, 2008, during a ceremony at the 2008 Louisiana Book Festival in Baton Rouge. On February 26, 2012, he won an Academy Award for Best Animated Short Film, The Fantastic Flying Books of Mr. Morris Lessmore.

Newsweek called him one of the top 100 people to watch in the new millennium.

Gold medal from the Society of Illustrators for Santa Calls.

Three silver medals from the Society of Illustrators.

Academy Awards 

Emmy Awards

Personal life
William Joyce lives with his son Jackson Edward Joyce in Shreveport, Louisiana. His daughter, Mary Katherine, died on May 2, 2010, at the age of 18, from complications of brain cancer. Rise of the Guardians, a film inspired by stories Joyce told her while young and later resulted in The Guardians of Childhood book series, was dedicated to her memory, reading “For Mary Katherine Joyce, a Guardian Fierce and True” during the credits. The main character of Epic, which is also based on Joyce's book, The Leaf Men and the Brave Good Bugs, was named after her. His wife, Frances Elizabeth Baucum Joyce, who was a Shreveport attorney, died on January 20, 2016, at the age of 55, from complications of ALS.

In 2006, Joyce founded the Katrinarita Gras Foundation to raise money for victims of Hurricane Katrina and Hurricane Rita. He is selling prints of his unpublished Mardi Gras The New Yorker cover through the foundation with all profit going to Louisiana artists and arts organizations.

Works by William Joyce

Books
In May 2017, Atheneum Young Readers released the picture book Bently & Egg, A Day with Wilbur Robinson, of which the film version is entitled Meet the Robinsons, and Dinosaur Bob and His Adventures with the Family Lazardo. All are under the label The World of William Joyce.

Note: All books are written and illustrated by William Joyce, except as noted

My First Book of Nursery Tales, retold by Marianna Mayer and illustrated by William Joyce (1983)
Tammy and the Gigantic Fish by Catherine & James Gray, illustrated by William Joyce (1983)
Waiting for Spring Stories by Bethany Roberts, illustrated by William Joyce (1984)
William Joyce's Mother Goose, illustrated by William Joyce (1984)
George Shrinks (1985)
Shoes, written by Elizabeth Winthrop (1986)
Dinosaur Bob and His Adventures with the Family Lazardo (1988)
Humphrey's Bear by Jan Wahl, illustrated by William Joyce (1989)
Some of the Adventures of Rhode Island Red by Stephen Manes, illustrated by William Joyce (1990)
A Day with Wilbur Robinson (1990)
Nicholas Cricket by Joyce Maxner, illustrated by William Joyce (1991)
Bently & Egg (1992)
Santa Calls (1993)
Don't Wake the Princess: Hopes, Dreams, and Wishes, Cover art (1993)
A Wiggly, Jiggly, Joggly Tooth by Bill Hawley, illustrated by William Joyce (1995)
The Leaf Men and the Brave Good Bugs (1996), Play (premiere at Strand Theatre, Shreveport) - 1998
Buddy (1997)
World of William Joyce Scrapbook by William Joyce, photos by Philip Gould and design by Christine Kettner (1997)
Life with Bob (board book) (1998)
Baseball Bob (board book) (1999)
The Art of Robots (2004)
The Art of Rise of the Guardians (2012)
The Fantastic Flying Books of Mr. Morris Lessmore (2012)
The Mischievians (2013)
The Numberlys, co-illustrated with Christina Ellis (2014)
A Bean, a Stalk and a Boy Named Jack (2014)
Billy's Booger (2015)
Ollie's Odyssey (2016)
Bently & Egg (2017)

Rolie Polie Olie series
Rolie Polie Olie (1999)
Rolie Polie Olie: How Many Howdys? (board book) (1999)
Rolie Polie Olie: A Little Spot of Color (board book) (2000)
Rolie Polie Olie: Polka Dot! Polka Dot! (board book) (2000)
Snowie Rolie (2000)
Rolie Polie Olie - Character Books: Olie, Spot, Zowie, Billie (2001)
Sleepy Time Olie (2001)
Big Time Olie (2002)
Busy Books - Peakaboo You!, Rolie Polie Shapes, Be My Pal!, Rocket Up, Rolie! (2002)

The Guardians of Childhood series

Novels
Nicholas St. North and the Battle of the Nightmare King, written with Laura Geringer (2011)
E. Aster Bunnymund and the Warrior Eggs at the Earth's Core! (2012)
Toothiana: Queen of the Tooth Fairy Armies (2012)
The Sandman and the War of Dreams (2013)
Jack Frost: The End Becomes the Beginning (2018)

Picture books
The Man in the Moon (2011)
The Sandman: The Story of Sanderson Mansnoozie (2012)
Jack Frost (2015)

Filmography

Film

Television series

Notes

References

External links

The Guardians of Childhood
William Joyce at Encyclopedia of World Biography
National Center for Children's Illustrated Literature 
William Joyce at publisher HarperCollins
 

1959 births
American animated film directors
American animated film producers
American children's book illustrators
American children's writers
American film producers
American production designers
Blue Sky Studios people
Daytime Emmy Award winners
Directors of Best Animated Short Academy Award winners
DreamWorks Animation people
C. E. Byrd High School alumni
Writers from Shreveport, Louisiana
Southern Methodist University alumni
Walt Disney Animation Studios people
Writers who illustrated their own writing
Living people
Pixar people